Below are the rosters for teams competing in the 2016 World Junior Ice Hockey Championships.

Group A

Head coach:  Dave Lowry

Head coach:  Olaf Eller

Head coach:  Rikard Grönborg

Head coach:  John Fust

Head coach:  Ron Wilson

Group B

Head coach: / Aleksandrs Belavskis

Head coach: / Jakub Petr

Head coach:  Jukka Jalonen

Head coach:  Valeri Bragin

Head coach:  Ernest Bokroš

External links
worldjunior2016.com

Rosters
World Junior Ice Hockey Championships rosters